Kenneth Lawrence Mackie (19 February 1911 – 7 October 1982) was an Australian rules footballer who played with Fitzroy and St Kilda in the Victorian Football League (VFL).

Notes

External links 

1911 births
1982 deaths
Australian rules footballers from Victoria (Australia)
Fitzroy Football Club players
St Kilda Football Club players
Heidelberg Football Club players